Dharapuram block is a revenue block in the Tiruppur district of Tamil Nadu, India. It is one among 16 revenue blocks in Tiruppur district. It has a total of 16 panchayat villages. The block had population of 70,372 as of 2011 Census of India.

See also 

 Dharapuram division
 Dharapuram taluk
 Dharapuram state assembly constituency

References 

 

Revenue blocks of Tiruppur district